Ved du hvem du er? is the Danish version of the British genealogy documentary series Who Do You Think You Are?

Episodes

Series 1 (2010)
Peter Mygind (15 September)
Alberte Winding (22 September)
Nikolaj Coster-Waldau (29 September)
Anne Linnet (6 October)
Puk Elgård (13 October)
Anne Marie Helger (20 October)

Series 2 (2012)
Frank Erichsen (1 February)
Annette Heick (8 February)
Anders W. Berthelsen (15 February)
Anders Lund Madsen and Peter Lund Madsen (22 February)
Hanne-Vibeke Holst (29 February)
Sanne Salomonsen (7 March)

Series 3 (2013)
Suzanne Bjerrehuus
Jan Gintberg
James Price and Adam Price
Szhirley Rokahaim
Nicolas Bro
Lisbeth Zornig Andersen

References
 "Ved du hvem du er? udsendelsesoversigt" at Danmarks Radio

External links
 Ved du hvem du er? at Danmarks Radio
 Who Do You Think You Are?

2010 Danish television series debuts
2012 Danish television series endings
Television series about family history
2010s Danish television series
Danish-language television shows
DR TV original programming